Kwasu FM  is an indigenous radio station operated by the Kwara State University, Malete, in Kwara State, Nigeria. The radio station operates on the 103.9 MHz frequency. The radio station started operations on 20 March 2019. Aside the radio sation for the institution, a television station has been proposed since 2014 by the Vice-Chancellor of the institution, Professor AbdulRasheed Na'Allah.

References 

Radio stations in Nigeria